Chronicle of Flaming Years (translit. Povest plamennykh let) is a 1961 Soviet drama film directed by Yuliya Solntseva. Solntseva won the award for Best Director at the 1961 Cannes Film Festival.

Cast
 Boris Andreyev
 Antonina Bogdanova  
 Zinaida Kiriyenko
 Sergei Lukyanov
 Mikhail Majorov  
 Vasili Merkuryev
 Nikolai Vinogradovsky  
 Svetlana Zhgun

References

External links

1961 films
1960s Russian-language films
1961 drama films
Films directed by Yuliya Solntseva
Mosfilm films
Soviet drama films